Đurđina Jauković (born 24 February 1997) is a Montenegrin handball player for Brest Bretagne Handball and the Montenegrin national team.

Achievements

National team
European Championship:
Bronze Medalist: 2022

European
EHF Champions League:
Finalist:  2021
Semi-Finalist: 2016, 2017

Domestic
Montenegrin Championship:
Winner: 2016, 2017, 2018, 2019
Montenegrin Cup:
Winner: 2016, 2017, 2018, 2019, 2020
Women's Regional Handball League:
Winner: 2016, 2019
French Women's First League Championship:
Winner: 2021
French Women's Cup Championship:
Winner: 2021

Awards and recognition
 Handball-Planet.com World Young Female All-Star Team: 2015–16
MVP of the European Junior Championship 2015
Top scorer of the European Junior Championship 2015

References

External links

1997 births
Living people
Montenegrin female handball players
Sportspeople from Nikšić
Handball players at the 2016 Summer Olympics
Handball players at the 2020 Summer Olympics
Olympic handball players of Montenegro
Mediterranean Games medalists in handball
Mediterranean Games silver medalists for Montenegro
Competitors at the 2018 Mediterranean Games
Expatriate handball players
Montenegrin expatriate sportspeople in France